Jeff Gralnick (April 3, 1939, Brooklyn, New York – May 9, 2011, Weston, Connecticut) was a television journalist 47 years, as well as a professor of new media at Columbia University and Fairfield University.

Gralnick served as a news consultant for NBC until his death. His experience includes: reporting on the field in Vietnam for CBS News. He served as a vice president and Executive Producer for ABC's World News Tonight, as an Executive Producer of NBC's Nightly News with Tom Brokaw, and as an Executive overlooking the creation of ABCNews.com. He covered the astronaut Alan Shepard's mission in 1961, produced the coverage for every U.S. space flight through Apollo 11, and also covered man's return to space in 1988 after the space shuttle Challenger's accident.

A graduate of New York University, Jeff was familiar with the NYC Metro as an adjunct professor of New Media at the Columbia University Graduate School of Journalism and the Fairfield University Journalism Program.

External links

Jeffery Charles Gralnick - Oldest son of Mildred (Feinstein) and Abe Gralnick (younger son William); born April 3, 1939; attended NYU and graduated 1960?; married Carol Beckmann October 18, 1963;  resided at 1144 Second Ave. NYC and later New Orleans, LA; one child, Leslie Michel, born November 21, 1965, at Touro Infirmary, New Orleans, Louisiana; divorced 1969.

Assignment Desk editor at CBS News 1961 (CBS-TV, New York City) - at CBS, worked with/for Mike Wallace, Don Hewitt, Walter Cronkite,  Hughes Rudd, Sandy Sokolow, Harry Reasoner, and in New Orleans after the JFK assassination with Nelson Benton,  Lew Wood and correspondent Bill Stout.
Columbia University Faculty Profile

References

American television news producers
American television journalists
2011 deaths
Fairfield University faculty
1939 births
American male journalists